Romitan District is a district of Bukhara Region in Uzbekistan. The capital lies at the city Romitan.

The district consists of 2 cities (Romitan, Gazli), 3 urban-type settlements (Qoqishtuvon, Xosa, Yuqori G'azberon) and 6 rural communities.

References

Bukhara Region
Districts of Uzbekistan